

Overview

There are five civil medical universities and one medical academy in Myanmar (Burma). All medical schools are recognised by Myanmar Medical Council and State Government. They are:

 University of Medicine-1, Yangon
 University of Medicine-2, Yangon
 Defence Services Medical Academy, Mingaladon, Yangon
 University of Medicine, Mandalay
 University of Medicine, Magway
 University of Medicine, Taunggyi

All medical universities in Myanmar offer the undergraduate MBBS degree (Bachelor of Medicine, Bachelor of Surgery). This degree is currently at the bachelor level, whereas the MD degree in the US is accredited to be a professional doctorate; thus the two degrees cannot be compared. Most Australian medical schools are in the process of moving from level 7 (MBBS) to level 9 (master's degree) MD (Doctor of Medicine) due to the Australian Qualifications Framework. The UK MBBS is now classified as master's degree (Level 7), according to the UK Quality Code for Higher Education.

University of Medicine-1, Yangon

The University of Medicine-1, formerly the Institute of Medicine-1, is the oldest of four medical institutions in Myanmar (formerly Burma). The students of four medical universities are selected from the candidates, who pass with the highest science scores in the matriculation examination of Myanmar. The university offers an M.B.B.S. equivalent of the M.D. degree. The University of Medicine-1 has three major campuses: (1) Lanmadaw Township campus, (2) Pyay Road campus, and (3) Thaton Road campus.
UM(1)is training 600 doctors every year and 73 postgraduate courses.

History

A course in medical science was first introduced in Burma in 1923-24 at Rangoon College, on the premises of the Rangoon General Hospital. In 1929, the classes were moved to the present building in Lanmadaw Township, the foundation of which was laid by Sir Harcourt Butler, on 2 February 1927. The medical college became a constituent college of the University of Rangoon in 1930.

From 1942 to 1945, during the World War II, there was a temporary suspension of the M.B., B.S. course. A modified course was conducted instead, on the successful completion of which the Licentiate of the State Medical Board (LSMB) was conferred. Although the medical college building remained intact, all the laboratory equipment, and all the mounts and specimens collected in the Pathology and Forensic Medicine Department Museums were completely destroyed, and valuable books from the College library were also lost.

After the war, all the constituent colleges of the reconstituted Rangoon University became Faculties, and the Medical College became the Faculty of Medicine, under the administration of the Dean.

On promulgation of the University Education Act in May, 1964, the Institutes of Medicine were established. In 1973, the administration of the three medical Institutes and the Institute of Dental Medicine was transferred to the Ministry of Health, and came under the direct control of the Department of Medical Education, now known as the Department of Health Manpower.

Post-graduate courses were instituted at the three Institutes of Medicine in 1964, the Dean of the courses being responsible to the Rector for their organization and administration. With the addition of new courses in 1970, the Board of Postgraduate Medical Studies came under the administration of the Director. With the institution of the Department of Medical Education in 1973, the Board has been under the direct charge of the Director-General of the Department of Medical Education, now known as the Department of Health Manpower.

Reproduced from Handbook of Institute of Medicine (1) Yangon (1991–1992)

 the General Medical Council of Great Britain and Northern Ireland (UK) recognised the M.B., B.S. degree of the Rangoon University and hence Rangoon Medical College in 1937 so that our medical graduates did not need to sit for LRCP & MRCS before working in UK or before pursuing further studies like MRCP & FRCS. Sayagyi U Aye got M.B., B.S. in 1936 so he had to sit for LRCP & MRCS. Sayagyi Aye U Ko Gyi passed M.B., B.S. in 1937 so that he could study DOMS straight.
 The medical course at Rangoon Medical College could be started only in 1923/24 academic year due to the Rangoon University students' first strike. So our pioneers in medicine like U Ba Than, Colonel Min Sein, Daw Yin May and U Maung Gale had to study in Calcutta and got M.B. (Calcutta), not M.B., B.S. (Calcutta). Professor Dr Khin Maung Win (Pathologist) was a graduate of Bombay University, and hence his first degree was M.B., B.S. (Bombay). Dr Maung Maung Taik got M.B., B.S. from University of  Lucknow.
 L.S.M.B. course was introduced only for a short time and the recipients were only three. I remember Professor U Aung Than of Dental College and Professor Daw Phayt of Microbiology as the two recipients of LSMB. The other person was probably Col. Myint Aung, the military surgeon and first professor of surgery at IM2.
 The students of L.M.P. (Licentiate of Medical Practice) were also taught at the Rangoon Medical College. The successful students were appointed as sub-assistant surgeons, a rank lower than the M.B., B.S. graduates.
 A condensed course for M.B., B.S. degrees for the LMPs were also run at the Rangoon Medical College. Col Hla Han is one of the successful LMP students to earn an M.B., B.S. degree. Professor U Aung Nyunt of Mandalay was another LMP who passed the condensed course.  Addendum (2) by Dr Maung Maung Nyo. The Medical College of Yangon, the foremost medical institution in the Far East before World War II and after. Actually, the Institute of Medicine 1 and hence the former Medical College is the mother institute of all other institutes of medicine in Burma including the Institute of Dental Medicine. The Medical Faculty of Rangoon University (as the our medical college was formally called after independence) opened the Branch Faculty of Medicine (BMF) in Mandalay in 1954 that became the Institute of Medicine Mandalay in 1964. The professors of Anatomy and Physiology were also appointed as the part-time professor and head of respective subjects in Medical College 2, Mingaladon until that college became Institute of Medicine 2, Yangon in 1964. The Dental College was also first opened as a constituent of the faculty of medicine and it later became the Institute of Dental Medicine in 1964. The basic sciences of dental medicine were taught by the departments of anatomy and physiology, later of biochemistry until lately up to 1992. Now, all the first Deans of all the Institutes of Medicine and Dental Medicine in Burma were the graduates of our Medical Faculty.

Courses offered and degree awarded
The M.B. and B.S. course work extends over seven years.

Subjects taught
First M.B., B.S.

Language & Communication
Burmese
English
Mathematics & statistics
Physics
Chemistry
Botany
Zoology
Traditional Medicine (30 hours)

Second M.B., B.S.
Anatomy
Medical Physiology
Medical Biochemistry

Third M.B., B.S. 
General pathology
Microbiology
Pharmacology

Students are also posted for six months each to the medical and surgical wards for clinical training.

Final M.B., B.S. Part I 
Forensic Medicine
Preventive and Social Medicine (with three weeks residential field training in the rural areas)
Systemic Pathology and haematology

Students attend lectures and clinics in medicine, surgery, child health, obstetrics & gynecology, and are posted to the various teaching hospitals, including posting in Departments of Preventive and Social Medicine for visiting urban health facilities.

Final M.B., B.S. Part II
Child Health
Medicine
Obstetrics & Gynecology
Surgery

Students are bound to classroom study in the first six months while they are rotated in the allied specialties, namely, eye, ear, nose & throat diseases, urology, neurology, tuberculosis, venereal diseases, orthopedics and traumatology, skin diseases, mental health and psychiatry, oro-maxillo-facial surgery, radiology, radiotherapy, nuclear medicine, anesthesiology, thoracic surgery, and paediatric surgery. Students are attached to hospitals in later one year while studying in clinical rotations.

A summative examination is held at the end of the Final M.B., B.S. Part II course. Problem Based Learning (PBL), Community Based Learning (CBL) and Behavioural Science will be incorporated, as relevant, in the M.B., B.S. course.

House Surgeon Training

All students, upon successful completion of the Final Part II examination, continue to receive hands-on training for a period of one year as house surgeons in one of the recognized Teaching Hospitals in Yangon and / or the state and division hospitals. Training periods are as follows:

MB., B.S. Degree was conferred to the candidates a year after the final part II examination in the past, but is only after completion of House-Surgeon ship nowadays.

Improvements and changes
M.B., B.S. Course (1930)

Yangon University passed a new curriculum for the M.B., B.S. degree course with a slight alteration in program structure of 1923 curriculum. There was no change in the 1st M.B., course. The teaching of Physical and Organic chemistry in second M.B. course was shortened to six months.

The 3rd M.B., B.S. course was of one-year duration and consisted of:
 Materia medica and Pharmacology
 General and Special Pathology including Medical Zoology and Bacteriology
 Morbid Anatomy including attendance to all post-mortem examination for three months.
 Morbid Histology
 Elementary Bacteriology and Medical Zoology
 Clinical clerkship

The final M.B., B.S. course was two years and it was divided into two parts (the Final Part I and the Final Part II M.B., B.S.).

The subjects taught in the Final Part I course were:

 Forensic Medicine (including medico-legal post-mortem examination)
 Hygiene and vaccination (including Practical Hygiene)

The examination was held at the end of one year.

The course leading to Part II of the final M.B., B.S. examination was as follows:
 Systemic Medicine
 Systemic Surgery
 Systemic Midwifery
 Applied anatomy and physiology
 Outpatient clerkship - 4 months
 Special Departments

Three months - Eye, Ear, Nose and Throat
Two months - Venereal Diseases & Skin
 Maternity Hospital - 3 months
 Clinical clerkship in medicine & Surgery

To fulfil the regulation of General Medical Council of Great Britain the instructions on child welfare, prenatal care and causes of excessive infantile mortality had to be included.

The candidate who failed in any one of the M.B., B.S. examinations could transfer himself to L.M. & S. course, if desired to do so. But candidates who had passed the L.M. & S. course were not granted any concession to enable them to follow a modified course leading to the degree of M.B., B.S.

The General Medical Council of Great Britain was again requested to reconsider the University's application for the recognition of its M.B., B.S. Degree as registrable qualification in Great Britain. The Committee of the General Medical Council informed the University that it was not expedient or just to accede to the request of the University.

M.B., B.S. Course (1935–36)

The prospectus of the Medical College of the University of Rangoon (1935–1936) stated that the duration of M.B., B.S. course was seven years (previously six years) from the time of matriculation - two years of pre-medical and five years of medical studies proper.

A candidate for admission into Medical College, had to pass the First M.B., B.S. course that normally extended over two years or one of the examinations recognized by the General Medical Council of Great Britain as prerequisite education.

There was no change in Second M.B., B.S. course but the subjects taught in clinical years were rearranged as follows:

The Third M.B., B.S.
 Materia Medica & Pharmacology
 Bacteriology & Medical Zoology

The Final Part I M.B., B.S.
 Pathology
 Forensic Medicine
 Hygiene and Public health

The Final Part II M.B., B.S.
 Medicine
 Surgery
 Obstetrics & Gynaecology

In the previous curriculum, Bacteriology and Medical Zoology were taught under Pathology in Third M.B., B.S. course. The teaching of Pathology was carried out in the Final Part I in 1935-36 curriculum.

Some of the rules for the students stated that the students who were absent without leave would be removed from the college and no student would be allowed to sit for a University Examination unless his attendance, work and conduct had been certified to be satisfactory by the Professor or Lecturer in each subject for which the student was appearing for the examination.

During the three years of clinical study, (i.e. starting from Third M.B., B.S.) the students had to work in the outpatient departments and the wards of the Rangoon General Hospital, and attend post-mortem examinations, clinics and surgical operations. They performed clinical duties under the supervision of the members of the staff of hospital who were also staff of the Medical College. The students were posted for a period of continuous duty at the Dufferin Hospital for training in Obstetrics and Gynaecology. The course of medical study was planned to conform to the requirements of the General Medical Council of Great Britain.

After passing the Final part II examination one could register as a medical practitioner with the Burma Medical Council. The M.B., B.S. degree was registrable in India and Burma. It was also anticipated that registration in Great Britain could be made in the near future.

The internship was not compulsory but the graduates were strongly recommended to spend a year at least as a House-physician or Surgeon in a well equipped hospital in order to gain experience and confidence in solving the problems that may be encountered in general practice. Only about ten posts were available a year in selected Civil General Hospitals in Burma. They were given an allowance of Rs.75/- per month.

The majority of graduates entered the private practice. Few posts were available in the Government Service; the Burma Railways, the Corporation of Rangoon and certain large commercial enterprises such as the Burmah Oil Co., the Irrawaddy Flotilla Co., Burma Corporation, Indo-Burma Petroleum Co. The initial pay ranged from Rs.200/- to Rs.400/- per month according to the nature of the duties and qualification of the applicants.

University of Medicine, Mandalay

The University of Medicine, Mandalay (formerly called Institute of Medicine, Mandalay) is one of four medical schools in Myanmar (formerly Burma). Unlike most tertiary education institutes, the Institute of Medicine is operated and managed by the Ministry of Health. The Institute of Medicine, Mandalay admits approximately 600 students annually, on the basis of scores from their Basic Education High School Examination (in science). Diplomas offered are M.B., B.S. (US equivalent of M.D.)

History
The Institute of Medicine, Mandalay was first founded as a branch of the Faculty of Medicine, of Mandalay University. In 1955, it relocated to its present site in Chan Aye Thar Zan Township in Mandalay.

The departments were established in phases. Departments of Anatomy and Physiology in 1954, Departments of Pharmacology, Pathology, Bacteriology, Medicine and Surgery in 1956, Departments of Obstetrics and Gynecology, Forensic Medicine and the Eye, Ear, Nose and Throat in 1957. On the first of July 1958 The Branch Faculty of Medicine became the Faculty of Medicine, Mandalay. The microbiology department was established in 1960. In 1964 the Faculty of Medicine was upgraded to the Institute of Medicine, Mandalay and the department of child health was established in the same year. The new system of medical education was implemented since 1964 and premedical courses were started with the establishment of departments of Myanmar, English, Chemistry, Physics, Zoology and Botany in the First M.B., B.S class. The department of biochemistry was established as a separate entity in 1987. Finally the department of orthopedics was created in 1990. The foundation stone of the present building complex was laid in 1983 and its construction has been completed in 1991.

Initially, the Mandalay General Hospital was the one of the teaching hospitals of the Institute such as 300 bedded hospital, worker's hospital. At present, No. 1 Base Military Hospital of Pyin U Lwin, Mandalay Workers Hospital, five specialty hospitals in Mandalay and five state and divisional general hospitals, and recently, Mandalay 300-bed Teaching Hospital — altogether thirteen hospitals are now affiliated to the Institute.

The Institute started with an intake of thirty-six undergraduate students which has now increased to about 700-1000 per year. Postgraduate courses were started in 1968 with master's degree programs in Physiology. The Institute is now conducting twelve diploma courses, nineteen master's degree courses, eleven doctor of medical science courses and seven Ph.D. courses.

The head of the Mandalay university is Professor Khin Maung Lwin.

Course
The whole course is the same as the major course of University of Medicine-1, Yangon.

University of Community Health, Magway

With the guidance and national health policy of U Nu's Government the Health Assistant Training School was established in 1951 in Yangon to provide health care to rural population where access to regular medical doctors are difficult. The main objective of that training school is to produce the health assistant within a short time (three years) while the medical doctors were trained for six year. Later, The school was moved a few kilometers north to Insein in 1963, and then to Hlegu in 1968. In 1989, the school came under the purview of the Ministry of Health. The school became the Institute of Community Health in 1991, and became a university in 1995 and began offering a four-year bachelor's degree program. The objective of the university of community health is also change and wide scope. In 1999, the military government moved the school out of Yangon Division to Upper Myanmar. University of Community Health, Magway is located on a 41.4-hectare campus at Htonpauk, about 14.5 km north of Magway, and 3.2 km off the Magway-Natmauk Road.

University of Community Health, Magway regularly accepts approximately 150 students (Male: Female = 70:30) who passed the matriculation examination. The required score for selection is approximately 450 for males and 470 for females.

Defence Services Medical Academy (DSMA)

The Defence Services Medical Academy (DSMA), located in Mingaladon, Yangon, is the University of Medicine of the Myanmar Armed Forces. One of the most selective universities in the country, the academy offers M.B., B.S. (equivalent of the M.D.) degree programs. Upon graduation, most DSMA cadets are commissioned with the rank of Lieutenant in the Myanmar Army Medical Corps. The military physicians are to serve the healthcare needs of rural people when they are assigned in the country's remote regions where access to healthcare is poor.

History

The DSMA was founded in 1992 as the Defence Services Institute of Medicine (DSIM) to develop physicians to serve in the Tatmadaw (Burmese Armed Forces). Prior to the founding of the academy, the Tatmadaw had recruited its medical and dental officers from civilian medical school graduates, who had to undergo a month-long basic military training program at the Medical Corps Center. While the medical corps of the Tatmadaw had always been short of physicians, by the early 1990s, the shortage became more pronounced as the military government, fearing student unrest, had shut down most civilian universities, following the 8888 Uprising in 1988. Most civilian universities were closed off and on for much of the 1990s. The military run universities essentially became the only venue for those who wished to continue university education inside the country.

The DSIM was operated by the Ministry of Health and the Ministry of Defence. The purported "aim of the DSMA is to produce good Medical officers endowed with brilliant physical and mental ability to safeguard The Three Main National Causes" espoused by the military government.

The first batch of 47 cadets from the DSIM were commissioned as lieutenants on 17 December 1999, after six years of study and a year as house-surgeons. Through nine intakes, the DSMA produced a total of 1525 medical officers. As of 2008, the DSMA had produced seven Doctor of Medical Science degree holders. The academy is only source of medical officers for the DMS. In terms of Master of Medical Science, by the early 2008, the DSMA had produced 335 specialists, including 48 physicians and 41 surgeons.

Admissions
The academy accepts approximately 400-500 students annually. Unlike at the country's other four civilian medical schools, the selection process goes beyond high university matriculation examination scores. All prospective candidates must be male, and must have high enough college matriculation exam scores to enter any civilian medical university. In addition, the prospective student must sit for another entrance exam as well as physical and psychological exams.

The selection criteria are:
 Males only
 DSMA entrance exams on: 1. biology, botany and zoology, and 2. English
 Physical fitness
 Teamwork and comradeship screening
 Psychometric assessment
 General interviews
 Medical checkups

The entrance selection including physical fitness tests, teamwork and comradeship screening, psychometric assessments and general interviews process takes about five to seven days at Officer Testing Team (OTT). Only those who pass all the tests and steps above are admitted to the DSMA. Students are eligible for various state scholarship programs.

Programs

The DSMA offers courses for both basic and advanced degrees in medicine and surgery, and runs 20 graduate programs in medical sciences.

 Bachelor of Medicine and Surgery (M.B., B.S.)
 Diploma in Medical Science (Dip.Med.Sc.)
 Master of Medical Science (M.Med.Sc.); Physiology, Anatomy, Biochemistry, Microbiology, Pharmacology, Pathology, Public Health, Forensic Medicine,  Internal Medicine, Surgery, Obstetrics and Gynaecology, Pediatrics, Orthopedics, Anaesthesiology, Radiology, Otorhinolaryngology, Ophthalmology, Mental Health, Medical regabilitastion.
 Doctor of Medical Science (Dr.Med.Sc.); Medicine, Surgery, Obstetrics and Gynaecology, Pediatrics, Orthopedics, Cardiac surgery, Cardiology, Neurology, Neurosurgery, Radiology, Anaesthesiology. Ophthalmology, Otorhinolaryngology, Urology, Renal Medicine, Forensic Medicine, Gastroenterology, Paediatric surgery
 Ph.D.

The DSMA is equipped with lab materials, modern textbooks, and training resources. As intern surgeons, the students must take a field practical tour of duty at military hospitals, where they get field training from professional surgeons. The academy is open year-round, and is in session for eleven months of study in an academic year—ten months of medical science coursework plus a month of military science and military leadership. Some DSMA graduates continue their post-graduate education in the UK.

Coursework
The M.B., B.S. coursework extends for seven years, and is the same as the major coursework of other civilian medical schools such as, the University of Medicine 1, Yangon, the University of Medicine 2, Yangon.

Subjects

First M.B., B.S.
Burmese
English
Mathematics and Statistics
Physics
Chemistry
Biology (Botany and Zoology)
Basic Computer Science
Behavioral Sciences
Introduction of Human Anatomy
Introduction Physiology and
Introduction of Biochemistry

Second M.B., B.S.
Anatomy
Physiology
Biochemistry

Third M.B., B.S. 
General pathology
Microbiology
Pharmacology
All cadets are also posted for 18 weeks each to the medical and surgical wards for clinical training at the school's teaching hospitals in Yangon.

Final M.B., B.S. Part I 
Forensic Medicine
Preventive and Social Medicine (with three weeks of residential field training in the rural areas).
Systemic Pathology and haematology
Students attend lectures & clinics in Medicine, Surgery, Child health, Obstetrics & Gynaecology, and posted to the various teaching hospitals, including urban health facilities as part of Preventive and Social Medicine teaching.

Final M.B., B.S. Part II
Surgery
Students study the allied specialities, namely, eye, ear, nose & throat diseases, urology, neurology, tuberculosis, venereal diseases, orthopaedics and traumatology, skin diseases, mental health and psychiatry, oro-maxillo-facial surgery, radiology, radiotherapy, nuclear medicine, anaesthesiology, thoracic surgery, and paediatric surgery.
Medicine
Obstetrics & Gynaecology
Child Health
A summative examination is held at the end of the Final M.B., B.S. Part II course. Problem Based Learning (PBL), Community Based Learning (CBL) and Behavioural Science are incorporated, as relevant, in the M.B., B.S. course.

House Surgeon Training
All students, after a successful completion of Final Part 2 MBBS Examination, continue on to hands-on training for a period of one year as house surgeons in the recognized teaching hospitals in Yangon and/or the State and Division Hospitals. Training periods are as follows:

Only after the completion of house-surgeonship, is the student awarded the M.B., B.S. degree.

Teaching hospitals
No (1) Defence Services General Hospital, Yangon (1000 bedded, Mingaladon)
Defence Services Obstetric, Gynaecological and Children's Hospital, Yangon (300 bedded, Mingaladon)
Defence Services Orthopaedic Hospital, Yangon (500 bedded, Mingaladon)
Defence Services Liver Hospital (500 bedded, Mingaladon)
No. 2 Military Hospital (500 bedded, Myoma Street, Dagon)
Defence Services General Hospital, Naypyidaw (1000 bedded)
Defence Services Obstetric, Gynaecological and Children's Hospital, Naypyidaw (300 bedded)
Defence Services General Hospital, Pyinoolwin (700 bedded)
Defence Services General Hospital, Meitila (500 bedded)
Defence Services General Hospital, Aungban (500 bedded)

Every DSMA cadet also studies military science and military leadership for one to two months per year from First MBBS to Final M.B., B.S. Part I. After graduation, every medical officer has been trained as a platoon commander.

University of Medicine, Taunggyi

The University of Medicine, Taunggyi located in Taunggyi, Shan State is one of universities of medicine in Myanmar. The university offers an M.B., B.S. degree program. The university was established in 2015.

The university has planned to accept 200 students from Shan State and Kayah State and start its first enrollment in December 2015.

See also
University of Public Health, Yangon
University of Community Health, Magway
University of Medicine 1, Yangon
University of Medicine 2, Yangon
University of Medicine, Magway
University of Medicine, Mandalay
University of Medicine, Taunggyi
University of Dental Medicine, Yangon
University of Dental Medicine, Mandalay
University of Nursing, Yangon
University of Nursing, Mandalay
University of Pharmacy, Yangon
University of Pharmacy, Mandalay
University of Medical Technology, Yangon
University of Traditional Medicine, Mandalay

References

External links
 List of Universities registered under WHO
 Myanmar Information Committee
 Myanmar Medical Council 2000
  A Collaborating Centre of the Joanna Briggs Institute, Myanmar
 Nagao Foundation
 myanmar.gov.mm
 MOFA Myanmar

Universities and colleges in Yangon
Medical schools in Myanmar
Military academies of Myanmar